Davide Sibilia (born 29 July 1999) is an Italian football player. He plays for Viterbese.

Club career

Genoa 
Born in Conegliano, Sibilia was a youth exponent of Genoa.

Loan to Albissola 
On 20 July 2019, Sibilia was loaned to Serie C side Albissola on a season-long loan deal. On 19 September he made his professional debut in Serie C for Albissola in a 3–2 home defeat against Olbia, he was replaced by Gabriele Raja after 71 minutes. One month later, on 18 November, he played his first entire match for the team, a 1–0 away defeat against Gozzano. On 23 December, Sibilia scored his first professional goal in the 9th minute of a 2–2 away draw against Lucchese. Sibilia ended his season-long loan to Albissola with 24 appearances, including 18 as a starter, and 1 goal.

Viterbese
On 17 September 2019 he signed with Serie C club Viterbese on a free-transfer. On 6 October he made his debut for the club as an 80th-minute substitute replacing Mario Pacilli in a 3–0 away defeat against Potenza. Two weeks later, on 19 October, Sibilia played his first match as a starter for Viterbese and he also scored his first goal in the 48th minute of a 6–1 home win over Rende, he was replaced by Mario Pacilli after 66 minutes. One week later, on 27 October, he played his first entire match for the club, a 2–0 home win over Sicula Leonzio.

Career statistics

Club

References

External links
 

1999 births
People from Conegliano
Sportspeople from the Province of Treviso
Living people
Italian footballers
Association football midfielders
Serie C players
Albissola 2010 players
U.S. Viterbese 1908 players
Footballers from Veneto